San Miguel de Horcasitas Municipality is a municipality in Sonora in north-western Mexico.

The municipal area is 1,768.45 km2. and the population was 5,626 in 2000.

Neighboring municipalities are:  Rayón Municipality, in the northeast, Ures Municipality, in the east, Hermosillo Municipality, in the south, and Carbó Municipality, in the northwest.

References

Municipalities of Sonora